The following elections occurred in the year 1846.

 1846 Chilean presidential election
 1846 French legislative election
 1846 Papal conclave

North America

United States
 1846 New York state election
 1846 and 1847 United States House of Representatives elections
 1846 and 1847 United States Senate elections

See also
 :Category:1846 elections

1846
Elections